Bagh Yeri (also Romanized as Bāgh Yerī; also known as Bāgh Barī) is a village in Quri Chay-ye Gharbi Rural District, Saraju District, Maragheh County, East Azerbaijan Province, Iran. At the 2006 census, its population was 40, in 9 families.

References 

Towns and villages in Maragheh County